Micale Malik Cunningham (born October 6, 1998) is an American football quarterback for the Louisville Cardinals.

Early years
Cunningham attended Park Crossing High School in Montgomery, Alabama. During his career, he passed for 6,276 yards and 71 touchdowns, while rushing for 1,926 yards and 32 scores. He committed to the University of Louisville to play college football.

College career
After redshirting his first year at Louisville in 2017, Cunningham appeared in 10 games and made three starts in 2018. He completed 40 of 67 passes for 473 yards with one touchdown and one interception and rushed for a team-high 497 yards and five touchdowns. In 2019, he completed 111 of 178 passes for 2,065 yards, 22 touchdowns and five interceptions. He also added 482 yards and six touchdowns. He was named the MVP of the 2019 Music City Bowl after passing for 279 yards with two touchdowns and rushing for 81 yards.
On Thursday November 18, Malik put up 527 yards of offense (224 rushing and 303 passing) in a blowout victory against Duke. He also had a total of 7 touchdowns (5 in the air and 2 on the ground)

Statistics

Personal life
Cunningham originally went by his middle name, Malik, before changing to his true first name, Micale, midway through the 2019 season. He again went by Malik in 2020.

References

External links
Louisville Cardinals bio

1998 births
Living people
Players of American football from Montgomery, Alabama
American football quarterbacks
Louisville Cardinals football players